The Ille is a small river in Brittany, France, right tributary of the river Vilaine. It flows into the Vilaine in the city Rennes.

The Ille is linked to the river Rance by the Canal d'Ille-et-Rance. By this canal, Rennes has a connection with the English Channel coast at St. Malo. The canal is used primarily for tourist boats.

The Ille flows through the department Ille-et-Vilaine and the following towns: Montreuil-sur-Ille, Betton and Rennes. From Montreuil to Rennes the river runs parallel to the Canal d'Ille-et-Rance.

References

Rivers of France
Rivers of Brittany
Rivers of Ille-et-Vilaine